Kaushik Reddy (born 21 December 1984) is an Indian former cricketer. He played fifteen first-class matches for Hyderabad between 2004 and 2007.

Currently nominated as MLC of Telangana state by TRS party chief, Chief Minister KCR.

See also
 List of Hyderabad cricketers

References

External links
 

1984 births
Living people
Indian cricketers
Hyderabad cricketers
People from Karimnagar
ICL India XI cricketers
Hyderabad Heroes cricketers